The Lawrence Transit System is the municipal public transportation agency in Lawrence, Kansas. It is a coordinated transit system with the City of Lawrence and the University of Kansas, operating Monday through Saturday from 6 a.m. to 8 p.m. on most routes. On election days, rides are free of charge.

ADA Services
The Lawrence Transit System offers paratransit services (T Lift) to serve the needs of riders who, because of a disability, are unable to use the Lawrence Transit System fixed-route system, and who meet the criteria established by the U.S. Department of Transportation under the Americans With Disabilities Act (ADA) of 1990. The JayLift provides ADA services for KU students, staff and faculty who are permanently or temporarily disabled to get to class or class-related activities.

Late Night Service (Night Line)
The Night Line service started June 1, 2013 and provides curb-to-curb, shared ride bus service from 8:00 p.m. to 6:00 a.m. Monday – Saturday anywhere within Lawrence.  The rides must be scheduled in advance, 8:00 a.m. – 5:00 p.m Monday – Saturday.  Each ride costs $2.00.

Policy Makers
Lawrence Transit System is a service of the City of Lawrence.  Policies for Lawrence Transit system are set by the Lawrence City Commission, with recommendations for the Public Transit Advisory Committee.
The University of Kansas Transit Commission, composed of faculty, staff and students, is responsible for campus transportation services; KU on Wheels, JayLift and SafeRide.

Bus Routes
1 - Downtown to Prairie Park
3 - Downtown to Lakeview Road
4 - North Lawrence to 9th & Iowa
5 - 31st & Iowa to East Hills Business Park
6 - Downtown to 6th & Wakarusa
7 - Downtown to 31st & Iowa
9 - 31st & Iowa to 6th & Wakarusa
10 - Downtown to 6th & Wakarusa
11 - 31st & Iowa to KU to Downtown
15 - Downtown to the Peaslee Center
27 - KU to Haskell Indian Nations University
29 - 27th & Wakarusa to KU
30 - Bob Billings & Kasold to KU
34 - KU to 7th Street
36 - 6th via Emery to KU
38 - 25th & Melrose to KU
41 - Campus Circulator (Yellow)
42 - Campus Circulator (Blue/Orange) 
43 - Campus Circulator (Red)
44 - Campus Evening Circulator

References

External links
Lawrence Transit System official site
KU on Wheels - University of Kansas bus service

Bus transportation in Kansas
Transit agencies in Kansas
Lawrence, Kansas